A toggle rope was part of the standard equipment of British commandos and the Parachute Regiment during World War II. This enabled them to be fastened together to create an ersatz rope ladder, or to secure around a bundle for hauling, among other uses. The ropes were carried around the commandos' waists while not in use.

External links

 
 

World War II infantry weapons of the United Kingdom